Sportino Inowrocław is a Polish basketball team, based in Inowrocław, playing in Dominet Bank Ekstraliga. Founded in 2002.

Best achievements
 Promotion to Dominet Bank Ekstraliga in season 2007/2008

References

Basketball teams in Poland
Sport in Kuyavian-Pomeranian Voivodeship
Inowrocław County